Global Asia is a quarterly magazine published by the East Asia Foundation. Similar in concept to Foreign Policy and Foreign Affairs, Global Asia deals with global issues, but with a special focus on Asia. The editor-in-chief is Chung-in Moon of Yonsei University.

Previous issues have covered topics such as: North Korea's nuclear problem, 2012 Nuclear Security Summit, China's rise, India's development, global financial crisis, and green growth.

Some of Global Asia's notable contributors include: 
 Vinod Aggarwal 
 Charles K. Armstrong 
 Ban Ki-moon, Walden Bello
 Walter Clemens, Jr. 
 Gerald Curtis
 Barry Eichengreen
 G. John Ikenberry
 Boris Johnson
 Kim Dae-jung
 Lee Myung-bak
 Barry Naughton
 Gary Samore
 David Shambaugh
 Heizō Takenaka
 Shashi Tharoor
 Yun Byung-se

External links 
 
 East Asia Foundation
 mention about Global Asia

2006 establishments in South Korea
English-language magazines
Magazines established in 2006
Magazines published in South Korea
Mass media in Seoul
Quarterly magazines
Political magazines